The Cheese Factory in the Hamlet (German: Die Käserei in der Vehfreude) is a 1958 Swiss historical comedy film directed by Franz Schnyder and starring Annemarie Düringer, Franz Matter and Heinrich Gretler. It is an adaptation of the 1850 novel of the same title by Jeremias Gotthelf. With its rural nineteenth century setting, it is part of the group of popular heimatfilm made after the Second World War.

Partial cast 
 Annemarie Düringer as Änneli
 Franz Matter as Felix
 Heinrich Gretler as Ammann
 Hedda Koppé as Ammännin
 Margrit Winter as Bethi
 Erwin Kohlund as Sepp
 Ruedi Walter as Peterli
 Margrit Rainer as Eisi
 Max Haufler as Eglihannes
 Emil Hegetschweiler as Pfarrer
 Willy Fueter as Käsefürst
 Christian Kohlund as Schüler

References

Bibliography 
 Luhr, William. World cinema since 1945. Ungar, 1987.

External links 
 

1958 films
1950s historical comedy films
Swiss historical comedy films
1950s German-language films
Films based on Swiss novels
Films set in Switzerland
Films set in the Alps
Films set in the 19th century
Films directed by Franz Schnyder
Adaptations of works by Jeremias Gotthelf